Florosa is an unincorporated community in Okaloosa County in the state of Florida in the United States.  Florosa has a population of 5,941, as of the 2015 American Community Survey. 

Florosa is a bedroom community for Hurlburt Field and Eglin Air Force Base. It is also home to Florosa Elementary School. Florosa is oftentimes considered to be part of either of the neighboring communities of Mary Esther or Navarre.

References 

Unincorporated communities in Okaloosa County, Florida

Populated places on the Intracoastal Waterway in Florida
Navarre, Florida